Brigadier-General Cyril Rodney Harbord,  (2 December 1873 – 28 September 1958) was a cavalry officer in the British Indian Army, where he served in the 30th Lancers (Gordon's Horse).

Harbord saw active service in the Second Boer War, the Somaliland campaign and the First World War, and rose in rank to command the 15th (Imperial Service) and the 2nd Indian Cavalry Brigades.

Background
Cyril Rodney Harbord was born on 2 December 1873, to Charles Hedgron and Rosalie Harriet Harbord. He was educated at Bedford School, graduated from the Royal Military College, Sandhurst as a Queen's Cadet, and joined the Indian Army as a second-lieutenant on 3 September 1892.

Military career
Harbord was promoted to lieutenant on 3 December 1894, to captain 26 November 1901, and to major 18 October 1910.

He was commissioned in the Imperial Yeomanry and saw active service with the 3rd Battalion in the Second Boer War, for which he was mentioned in despatches, awarded Queen's South Africa Medal with three clasps and the King's South Africa Medal with two clasps. He left Cape Town in April 1902, arrived at Southampton the following month, and relinquished his commission with the Imperial Yeomanry in August 1902. Following his return, he served with the 29th Lancers (Deccan Horse) and as a special service officer on the staff of the Somaliland Field Force in 1904.

This was followed by service in the First World War. On the Western Front and in the Sinai and Palestine campaign. On 16 April 1917 he was promoted to temperay brigadier-general and given commanded of the 15th (Imperial Service) Cavalry Brigade. While in command of the brigade he was made a Companion of the Distinguished Service Order in April 1918, and appointed a Companion of the Order of St Michael and St George in May 1919.

For his service in the war he was awarded, by the Sultan of Egypt, the Order of the Nile third class in November 1919. Having reverted to his peace time rank after the war, in December 1926 he was a colonel and commander of the 2nd Indian Cavalry Brigade at Sialkot in India, when he was appointed a Companion of the Order of the Bath.

Harbord retired from the army in 1929 and died 28 September 1958.

Family
Harbord was married to Kathleen Mary Cocks (née Fox), with whom he had four children. One son was killed in action during the Second World War.

References

1873 births
1958 deaths
British Army personnel of the Second Boer War
Companions of the Order of the Bath
Companions of the Order of St Michael and St George
Companions of the Distinguished Service Order
Graduates of the Royal Military College, Sandhurst
Indian Army cavalry generals of World War I
People educated at Bedford School
British people in colonial India